6-Hydroxynicotinate 3-monooxygenase (NicC, 6HNA monooxygenase, HNA-3-monooxygenase) is an enzyme with systematic name 6-hydroxynicotinate,NADH:oxygen oxidoreductase (3-hydroxylating, decarboxylating). This enzyme catalyses the following chemical reaction

 6-hydroxynicotinate + NADH + H+ + O2  2,5-dihydroxypyridine + NAD+ + H2O + CO2

6-Hydroxynicotinate 3-monooxygenase a flavoprotein (FAD).

References

External links 
 

EC 1.14.13